Aminu Umar (born 6 March 1995) is a Nigerian professional footballer who plays as a winger for TFF First League club Bodrumspor and the Nigeria national football team.

Club career

Wikki Tourists
In 2012–2013 season Umar  scored one league goal for Wikki Tourists in the Nigeria Premier League the top league of Nigerian football.

Samsunspor
Umar joined Turkish club Samsunspor from Wikki Tourists in the 2013 summer transfer season at age 18. He scored four league goals in his first season and established himself as the club's preferred striker in place of his compatriot Ekigho Ehiosun.

International career
Umar has played for the Nigeria national under-20 football team. He was the leading scorer in the 2013 African youth championship with four goals and scored twice at the 2013 FIFA U-20 World Cup finals in Turkey. He was selected by Nigeria for their 35-man provisional squad for the 2016 Summer Olympics. Umar scored the second goal against Denmark that send Nigeria to the semi-final of Rio 2016 Olympic games.

Honours
Nigeria U23
Olympic Bronze Medal: 2016

References

External links

Aminu Umar

1995 births
People from Abuja
Living people
Nigerian footballers
Nigeria under-20 international footballers
Nigeria international footballers
Association football forwards
Wikki Tourists F.C. players
Samsunspor footballers
Ankaraspor footballers
Çaykur Rizespor footballers
Süper Lig players
TFF First League players
Footballers at the 2016 Summer Olympics
Olympic footballers of Nigeria
Medalists at the 2016 Summer Olympics
Olympic bronze medalists for Nigeria
Olympic medalists in football
African Games bronze medalists for Nigeria
African Games medalists in football
Competitors at the 2015 African Games
Nigerian expatriate footballers
Expatriate footballers in Turkey
Nigerian expatriate sportspeople in Turkey